Destinations Academy is a public alternative high school in Coos Bay, Oregon, United States, located at 1255 Hemlock.

Academics
In 2008, 29% of the school's seniors received their high school diploma. Of 35 students, 10 graduated, 21 dropped out, and 4 are still in high school.

References

Alternative schools in Oregon
High schools in Coos County, Oregon
Coos Bay, Oregon
Public high schools in Oregon